McBurnie Coachcraft was a US bodywork company mostly known for their replicas of Ferrari Daytona Spyder. McBurnie also manufactured a Ferrari 250 GTO replica in the style of the Alpha One GTO, and the Velo Rossa. See, Ferrari S.p.A. v. McBurnie Coachcraft, 10 U.S.P. Q.2d 1278 (S.D.Cal.1988).

The Daytona replicas are based on the Chevrolet Corvette C3 and became very popular because they were featured in the TV series Miami Vice where the main character Sonny Crockett drives a black Daytona Spyder. Ferrari took legal action to stop McBurnie and other replica manufacturers from producing those replicas, under the legal principle of trade dress.

An arson fire at McBurnie's shop on April 28, 1989 (less than a year after the case was decided) caused significant damage to the building and vehicles inside.

Tom McBurnie went on to manufacture a hot rod kit called ″34 Lightning,″ as well as replicas of the Porsche 550 and Porsche 356 Speedster under the company name Thunder Ranch. McBurnie also produced the RIOT car as seen on the television series Baywatch. Tom partnered with San Diego State University to make an electric RIOT car with hybrid technology. The rights to the RIOT were sold to Nathan Wratislaw.

In 2012 McBurnie sold his company to Carrera Coachwerks partners Theo Hanson and Alan Cassell. Anticipating a dispute with Porsche, the name was changed to Custom Coachwerks in 2013 or 2014. However, the El Cajon, CA shop was subsequently closed and assets divided by the partners.

References

External links
 Mc Burnie's RSK 550 & Speedsters
 Mc Burnie's RIOT
 SDSU RIOT Car

Kit car manufacturers